Rankin's Pass is situated in the Limpopo Province on the road between Thabazimbi and Modimolle (South Africa). The small settlement of Alma lies near the start of the pass.

Rankins Pass is not actually a true mountain pass but more of an outpost or toll point as there is no sign of any proper climbing or bends.

References

Mountain passes of Limpopo